James Denton (died 23 February 1533) was a Canon of Windsor from 1509 to 1533 Archdeacon of Cleveland from 1523 - 1533, and Dean of Lichfield from 1523 to 1532.

Career

He was educated at Eton College and King's College, Cambridge, where he graduated BA in 1490, MS in 1492 and D.Can.L. in 1505 (incorporated from Valencia)

He was appointed:
Rector of St Olave's Church, Southwark 1507
Prebendary of Lichfield Cathedral 1509
Prebendary of Highworth in Salisbury Cathedral 1509
Prebendary of Lincoln Cathedral 1514
Rector of St Swithun's Church, Headbourne Worthy, Hampshire
Almoner and Chancellor to Mary Tudor, Queen of France
Chaplain to Henry VIII of England
Dean of Lichfield 1522 - 1533
Archdeacon of Cleveland 1523 - 1532

He was appointed to the ninth stall in St George's Chapel, Windsor Castle in 1509, a position he held until 1533.

He built a property in 1519 adjacent to the chapel, known as Denton’s Commons, as a residence for the choristers and chantry priests to live and eat. This property was demolished in 1895.

Notes 

1533 deaths
Canons of Windsor
Archdeacons of Cleveland
Deans of Lichfield
People educated at Eton College
Alumni of King's College, Cambridge
Fellows of King's College, Cambridge
Year of birth missing